The Slazenger Trophy was a men's professional team golf competition; one team representing Great Britain and Ireland, the other team representing the British Commonwealth and Empire. It was played just once, in 1956.

Format
The cup was contested over two days with four 36-hole foursomes on the first day and eight 36-hole singles matches on the second day.

History
The match was played on 20 and 21 July 1956 at Prince's Golf Club, Sandwich. The match was organised by the Golf Society of Great Britain. Most of the Commonwealth and Empire team had been in England to play in the Canada Cup at the end of June.

Result

Appearances
The following are those who played in the match.

Great Britain and Ireland
  Harry Bradshaw
  Bill Branch
  Max Faulkner
  Arthur Lees
  Eric Lester 
  Christy O'Connor Snr
  Dai Rees
  Syd Scott
  Norman Sutton
  Harry Weetman

Commonwealth and Empire
  Frank Buckler
  Bruce Crampton
  Bobby Locke
  Frank Phillips
  Gary Player
  Ernie Southerden
  Peter Thomson
  Norman Von Nida
  Trevor Wilkes

The Australian Bill Shankland was in the Commonwealth and Empire team but did not play in any matches.

References

Team golf tournaments